Seaton is a suburb of Adelaide, South Australia, located in the western suburbs near Findon, Grange and West Lakes. Seaton is home to the Royal Adelaide Golf Club.

History
Prior to World War II the area was largely rural, with market gardens, poultry farms and lucerne paddocks, bounded to the west by sand dunes. With the rapid development of industry during and after the war years, including the munitions factory at Hendon and the General Motors-Holden motor vehicle assembly plant at Woodville, the South Australian Housing Trust developed large areas of low-cost workers' housing in Seaton and other nearby suburbs.

The first Seaton Post Office opened on 1 September 1965, renamed from Seaton Park; in 1991 it closed and was replaced by the second office renamed from Seaton North.

Seaton is known for its football team, the Seaton Ramblers, who play in Division Three in SAAFL.

Education
There are currently two schools (both of which are Government and co-educational) located within Seaton:

Seaton Park Primary School, located on Balcombe Avenue.
Seaton High School, located on the corner of Frederick Road and Glenburnie Street.

References

Suburbs of Adelaide